Jadavpur Journal of International Relations is a peer-reviewed journal that aims to provide a forum for discussing domestic issues which impinge on the making/implementation of foreign policies.

It is published twice in a year by SAGE Publications in association with Jadavpur University, Kolkata

This journal is a member of the Committee on Publication Ethics (COPE).

Abstracting and indexing 
Jadavpur Journal of International Relations is abstracted and indexed in:
 J-Gate

External links
 
 Homepage

References
 http://publicationethics.org/members/jadavpur-journal-international-relations
 http://www.jaduniv.edu.in/

SAGE Publishing academic journals
Biannual journals
International relations journals
Political science journals
Publications established in 2013